Dimethylphosphine oxide is an organophosphorus compound with the formula (CH3)2P(O)H.  It is a  colorless liquid that soluble in polar organic solvents.  It exists as the phosphine oxide, not the hydroxy tautomer.  A related compound is diphenylphosphine oxide.  Both are sometimes called secondary phosphine oxides.

Preparation
The compound arises by the hydrolysis of chlorodimethylphosphine:
Me2PCl  +  H2O  →   Me2P(O)H  +  HCl
Methanol, but not ethanol, can also be used in place of water, the co-product being methyl chloride.

Since chlorodimethylphosphine is dangerous to handle, alternative routes to dimethylphosphine oxide have been developed.  A popular method starts with diethylphosphite, according to the following idealized equations:
(C2H5O)2P(O)H  +  3 CH3MgBr   →  (CH3)2P(O)MgBr  +  2 MgBr(OC2H5)  +  CH4
(CH3)2P(O)MgBr  +  H2O   →  (CH3)2P(O)H  +  2 MgBr(OH)

Reactions
Chlorination gives dimethylphosphoryl chloride.  It undergoes hydroxymethylation with formaldehyde.  
Me2P(O)H  +  CH2O   →   Me2P(O)CH2OH
Many aldehydes effect a similar reaction.

References

Organophosphine oxides